Mathew Madsen (born 16 December 1991) is a New Zealand male weightlifter, competing in the 77 kg category and representing New Zealand at international competitions. He participated at the 2014 Commonwealth Games in the 77 kg event.

Major competitions

References

1991 births
Living people
New Zealand male weightlifters
Place of birth missing (living people)
Weightlifters at the 2014 Commonwealth Games
Commonwealth Games competitors for New Zealand
20th-century New Zealand people
21st-century New Zealand people